Gone Nutty (also known as Scrat's Missing Adventure) is a 2002 American computer-animated short film directed by Carlos Saldanha for Blue Sky Studios. The short features the character Scrat from Ice Age, who is yet again having troubles with collecting his beloved acorns. It was released on November 26, 2002 on the Ice Age DVD and VHS. This film was later shown in theaters with Garfield: The Movie in 2004.
The film was nominated for the 2003 Academy Award for Best Animated Short Film.

Plot 
After the events of the first film Scrat (Chris Wedge), after having found a new acorn, discovers a huge tree hollowed out and filled to the brim with acorns. There is one more empty spot in the middle of the acorns where Scrat tries to stuff the last acorn he brought with him (he first tries to put it in the same way he had done in the opening of the first film, but he seems to remember what would happen if he did, so he gently screws it in instead). However, it pops back out when his back is turned and after two more tries at getting it in place—both of which end up with the same result—Scrat gets frustrated and stomps it into place, unwittingly causing all the acorns to fall out of a hole in the tree. The avalanche of acorns sends Scrat sliding down the side of a mountain. The acorns and Scrat then go into free fall.

A short musical scene follows (to the tune of Tchaikovsky's Sleeping Beauty Waltz) with Scrat collecting acorns as he falls. Eventually Scrat collects and forms a 3-D sphere with the acorns, but then (with Scrat on top of it) it tilts upside down so Scrat and the acorns finally land hard on the icy land down below. There is one lone acorn left in the atmosphere (presumably the one he was trying to stuff into the tree). Scrat, who is still stuck in the snow, is only able to free his arms before the acorn impacts right between his eyes with the force of a rifle bullet. The extreme force with which the acorn hits the ground causes a great big earthquake, which shapes the Earth's continents (probably Pangaea) into their present-day form, taking all the other acorns with them and trapping Scrat on the original spot from the center of the impact. When Scrat digs out the acorn that hit him, he finds it has been charred and thus crumbled into ash. In disappointment and defeat, he turns to the camera, then sighs and puts on the remaining acorn cap as a beret.

Voice cast
 Chris Wedge as Scrat

References

External links
 
 
 

Ice Age (franchise) films
2002 films
2002 computer-animated films
American animated short films
20th Century Fox short films
Computer-animated short films
Blue Sky Studios short films
2000s American animated films
Films directed by Carlos Saldanha
2002 short films
Animated films without speech
American comedy short films
Animated films about squirrels